John Schofield may refer to:

John Schofield (1831–1906), American soldier
John Schofield (footballer) (born 1965), English football manager
John Schofield (VC) (1892–1918), English recipient of the Victoria Cross
Ducky Schofield (John Richard Schofield, 1935–2022), American baseballer

See also
John Scofield (born 1951), American musician